The  New York Giants season was the franchise's 31st season in the National Football League. It was also the Giants' last season playing their home games at the Polo Grounds before moving to Yankee Stadium the following year. The Giants were attempting to improve on their 7–5 record from 1954. The Giants finished with a 6–5–1 record, finishing in third place and missing the playoffs.

Schedule

Standings

See also 
 List of New York Giants seasons

New York Giants seasons
New York Giants
1955 in sports in New York City
1950s in Manhattan
Washington Heights, Manhattan